The Gulf of Urabá is a gulf on the northern coast of Colombia. It is part of the Caribbean Sea. It is a long, wide inlet  located on the coast of Colombia, close to the connection of the continent to the Isthmus of Panama. The town of Turbo, Colombia, lies at the mid eastern side naturally sheltered by the Turbo Bay part of the Gulf. The Atrato River flows into the Gulf of Urabá.

A study by Bio-Pacifico has suggested, as an alternative to building a 54‑mile (87 km) link across the Darién Gap to complete the Pan-American Highway, that the Panama section of the highway be extended to the Caribbean coast and end at the Gulf of Urabá, then be connected by ferry to existing highways in Colombia.

Urabá Antioquia subregion
The area surrounding the gulf comprises a geopolitical subregion of Colombia known as Urabá Antioquia.

References

Regiones Antioquenas: Uraba

Uraba
Uraba
Colombian coasts of the Caribbean Sea